Krefeld I – Neuss II is an electoral constituency (German: Wahlkreis) represented in the Bundestag. It elects one member via first-past-the-post voting. Under the current constituency numbering system, it is designated as constituency 110. It is located in western North Rhine-Westphalia, comprising the southern part of the city of Krefeld and the northern part of the Rhein-Kreis Neuss district.

Krefeld I – Neuss II was created for the 2002 federal election. Since 2009, it has been represented by Ansgar Heveling of the Christian Democratic Union (CDU).

Geography
Krefeld I – Neuss II is located in western North Rhine-Westphalia. As of the 2021 federal election, it comprises the Stadtbezirke of West, Süd, Fischeln, Oppum-Linn, and Uerdingen from the independent city of Krefeld and the municipalities of Jüchen, Kaarst, Korschenbroich, and Meerbusch from the district of Rhein-Kreis Neuss.

History
Krefeld I – Neuss II was created in 2002 and contained parts of the abolished constituencies of Krefeld and Neuss II. In the 2002 through 2009 elections, it was constituency 111 in the numbering system. Since 2013, it has been number 110.

Members
The constituency was first represented by Willy Wimmer of the Christian Democratic Union (CDU) from 2002 to 2009. Ansgar Heveling was elected in 2009, and re-elected in 2013, 2017, and 2021.

Election results

2021 election

2017 election

2013 election

2009 election

References

Federal electoral districts in North Rhine-Westphalia
2002 establishments in Germany
Constituencies established in 2002
Krefeld
Rhein-Kreis Neuss